Monica Seles was the defending champion, but lost in the final to Gabriela Sabatini, 6–3, 6–2.

Seeds 
The top eight seeds received a bye to the second round.

Draw

Finals

Top half

Section 1

Section 2

Bottom half

Section 1

Section 2

References

External links 
 ITF tournament edition details

1991 WTA Tour
 
Italian Open (tennis)
Italian Open
May 1991 sports events in Europe